Carter Hill is a historic plantation complex located near Camden, Kershaw County, South Carolina.  The overseer's house was built about 1840, and now incorporated into the main house built about 1875. The overseer's house was a one-room house, that incorporates architectural elements  in the Greek Revival style. The main house reflects the rural Victorian architectural style predominant after the American Civil War. Also on the property are a log building, a frame building, a pump house, a smokehouse, a dovecote, a hen house, and a barn constructed at various times during the 19th century. It was listed on the National Register of Historic Places in 1992.

References

Plantations in South Carolina
Plantation houses in South Carolina
Houses on the National Register of Historic Places in South Carolina
Houses completed in 1840
Historic districts on the National Register of Historic Places in South Carolina
Houses in Kershaw County, South Carolina
Camden, South Carolina
National Register of Historic Places in Kershaw County, South Carolina